Trechus renei is a species of ground beetle in the subfamily Trechinae. It was described by Belousov in 1990.

References

renei
Beetles described in 1990